The 2006 W-League Season was the league's 12th.

Changes from 2005 season

Name changes
 Denver Lady Cougars became Real Colorado Cougars.
 Detroit Jaguars became Michigan Hawks.
 Mile High Mustangs became the Mile High Edge.

New teams
Five teams were added for the season:

Teams Leaving
One team folded after the 2005 season:
 Arizona Heatwave

Standings
Blue indicates division title clinched
Green indicates playoff berth clinched
Orange indicates bye into the W-League semifinals as hosts.

Central Conference

Atlantic Division

Midwest Division

Eastern Conference

Northeast Division

Northern Division

Western Conference

Playoffs

Format

Conference Brackets
Central Conference

Eastern Conference

Western Conference

W-League Championship Bracket

Divisional Round

Conference semifinals

Conference finals

W-League Semifinals

W-League Third-Place Game

W-League Finals

References

2006
Women
W
1